Laramie High School (LHS) is a high school (grades 9–12) in Laramie, Albany County, Wyoming, United States.  In the Albany County School District, high school begins in the 9th grade (freshman year); 9th grade students are now able to attend high school in Laramie due to the building of a new high school. Many LHS students concurrently attend classes at Laramie County Community College (Albany County Campus), or the University of Wyoming.

Laramie High School has an online newspaper, the CyberPlainsman.

As of the opening of the new building in the 2015–2016 school year, Laramie High School has the highest elevation in the state, at 7280 ft.

Sports 
The LHS mascot is the Plainsman (female counterpart: Lady Plainsman).

The Laramie High School football team was coached for 59 years John E. Deti (1944-1976) and his son John R. Deti (1977-2002).  Following the younger Deti's retirement, the team has been coached by Phil Treick (2003-2004), Neil Waring (2005-2007), Bob Knapton (2008-2011), Ted Holmstrom (2012), Chuck Syverson (2013-2016), Clint Reed (2017-2020), and Paul Ronga (2021-present).

Notable alumni 
 John S. Bugas - former FBI agent credited with breaking up two Nazi spy rings and deterring sabotage;  former director of industrial relations at Ford Motor Company
 Wayde Preston - actor
 Ken Sailors - basketball player for the Wyoming Cowboys and in the NBA, pioneer of the jump shot
 Gerry Spence - trial lawyer, author, and television legal consultant

See also 
 List of high schools in Wyoming

References

External links 
 Laramie High School
 Schooltree.org
 The Laramie High School Football films at the American Heritage Center

Public high schools in Wyoming
Schools in Albany County, Wyoming
Buildings and structures in Laramie, Wyoming